Platja Es Pinet is in a small cove within the bay of Sant Antoni Bay. The beach is on the northern seaboard of the Spanish island of Ibiza. Although it is but a short distance from Sant Antoni, It is in the municipality of Sant Josep de sa Talaia. The beach sand is soft and the water is safe, clean, and shallow.

References

Beaches of Ibiza
Blue Flag beaches of Ibiza
Beaches of the Balearic Islands